The Hetton Colliery Lyon or Lyons is an early British steam locomotive that still survives in preservation. It is remarkable for having continued working into the early 20th century.

Hetton Colliery 

The Hetton colliery railway opened in 1822 with steam traction. Although once thought to date from this time, Lyon is now thought to have been built by the colliery in 1851-52. Its designer is thought to be an engineer named Young. A descendant, David Young, now works on the restoration of steam engines at Beamish. Lyon would have been of archaic design by 1852. The view has been put forward that it was one of a pair of replicas built by Sir Lindsay Wood (1834–1920) from interest in his father Nicholas Wood's earlier designs. The other example was destroyed by a boiler explosion in 1858/1859.

1882 rebuilding 
It was extensively rebuilt in 1882. This included modern features, such as paired Salter spring balance safety valves.

Late service 

The locomotive continued in service at Hetton colliery until either 1908 or 1912. This was already remarkable at the time and a photograph of it was published in the Railway Magazine in 1905.

It has worked out its last days at the Colliery driving machinery in the pit sawmill.

Preservation 
In 1925, the Stockton and Darlington Railway celebrated its centenary. The LNER organised a cavalcade of locomotives to commemorate this. Locomotion No. 1 was propelled by a dummy petrol engine in its tender, but Lyon was steamed and ran under its own power, leading the cavalcade of fifty three locomotives.

The locomotive became part of the initial collection of the National Railway Museum at York. In 1974 was loaned to the new Beamish Museum where it was initially displayed in the Colliery and latterly at the Waggonway, together with working replicas of contemporary locomotives.

In 2006 it was moved to the Locomotion museum at Shildon, but returned to Beamish in May 2011.

Dating 
There is some debate over the locomotive's original construction date, and even its name. Lowe (1975) gives the name as Lyons, but most current sources favour Lyon. Both are probably derived from the name of Hetton Lyons Colliery, which closed in 1960 and is now the site of an industrial estate and a country park.

The Hetton colliery railway used steam locomotives from the outset; four built in 1820 and one in 1822. They were developments of George Stephenson's earlier Killingworth design. These were of 0-4-0 arrangement with two vertical cylinders, one above each axle, and the wheels coupled by drive chains. They used steam springs for suspension, there not yet being a way of forging an adequate steel spring to carry the weight of a locomotive.

For many years, before and during preservation, it was thought that Lyon was one of this original group of locomotives, built in 1822. Lowe describes four named 1820 locomotives and an unnamed 1822 locomotive, which he identifies as this one, the only one to be preserved. Its designers were held to be George Stephenson and Nicholas Wood.

It is now thought to have first been constructed in 1852, some years after Stephenson's death. The design is little changed from Stephenson locomotives of the 1820s (i.e. before Rocket) and this confused early researchers. The use of either the single flued boiler or the vertical cylinders were obsolete by Rocket. One distinctive difference from these locomotives was the enlarged smokebox with an easily opened door, providing more space for and easier cleaning of ashes.

Vertical-boilered Lyons 

Two quite separate locomotives, Lyons and Eppleton, were built at the colliery much later on, similar to those also built locally by Head Wrightson. These were small vertical-boilered well tank, with chain drive from a small vertical engine. Lyons locomotive was described in The Locomotive Magazine in 1901.

Lowe's view is that Lyon dates from 1822 and the Lyons he describes is this later locomotive with a vertical boiler and chain drive,.

Notes

References

External links 

Beamish photostream @ Flickr
 https://www.flickr.com/photos/janner2011/14810664347
 https://www.flickr.com/photos/emdjt42/13910446739
 https://www.flickr.com/photos/exfordy/6010012144
 https://www.flickr.com/photos/nigelmenzies/13903006071

Early steam locomotives
Preserved steam locomotives of Great Britain
0-4-0 locomotives